Seo District (Seo-gu, 서구) is a gu, or district, in western Daegu, South Korea.  A major transportation nexus, it is transected by the Gyeongbu, Guma, and Jungang Expressways.  It is also connected to the downtown region and to Dalseong County by Daegu Subway Line 2.  The Gyeongbu Line railroad also passes through Seo-gu, but no major stations are located there.

Seo-gu stands at the western edge of Daegu's urbanized region. It is bounded by the downtown Jung-gu district to the east, by Dalseo-gu to the south and Buk-gu to the north, and by the largely rural area of Dalseong-gun to the west. Most of the western third of Seo-gu is taken up by the rural Sangjungi-dong precinct.

Twin towns – sister cities

Seo District is twinned with:
 Bacolod, Philippines
 Angeles City, Philippines
 Hexi (Tianjin), China
 Keqiao (Shaoxing), China

Notable people from Seo District 

 Kim Tae-hyung known by his stage name V, actor, singer-songwriter, dancer, record producer, composer and member of one of the most successful boyband and best selling artist ever in South Korea, BTS is native of Seo District, Daegu.

See also 
Seogu Kids Library

References

External links

Official site 

 
Districts of Daegu